Fluorobenzene is the chemical compound with the formula C6H5F, often abbreviated PhF.  A colorless liquid, it is a precursor to many fluorophenyl compounds.

Preparation
PhF was first reported in 1886 by O. Wallach at the University of Bonn, who prepared the compound in two steps.  Phenyldiazonium chloride was first converted to a triazene using piperidine:

[PhN2]Cl  +  2 (CH2)5NH  →  PhN=N-N(CH2)5  +  [(CH2)5NH2]Cl
The triazine was then cleaved with hydrofluoric acid:
PhN=N-N(CH2)5  +  2 HF  →  PhF  +  N2  +  [(CH2)5NH2]F

Historical note: in Wallach's era, the element fluorine was symbolized with "Fl". Thus, his procedure is subtitled "Fluorbenzol, C6H5Fl".

On the laboratory scale, PhF is prepared by the thermal decomposition of the benzenediazonium tetrafluoroborate:
PhN2BF4  →  PhF  +  BF3   +  N2
According to the procedure, solid [PhN2]BF4 is heated with a flame to initiate an exothermic reaction, which also affords boron trifluoride and nitrogen gas.  Product PhF and BF3 are readily separated because of their differing boiling points.

The technical synthesis is by the reaction of cyclopentadiene with difluorocarbene. The initially formed cyclopropane undergoes a ring expansion and subsequent elimination of hydrogen fluoride.

Reactions
PhF behaves rather differently from other halobenzene derivatives owing to the pi-donor properties of fluoride.  For example, the para position is more activated than benzene toward electrophiles.  For this reason, it can be converted to 1-bromo-4-fluorobenzene with relatively high efficiency.

Solvent properties

PhF is a useful solvent for highly reactive species. Its melting point at -44 °C is lower than that of benzene. In contrast, the boiling points of PhF and benzene are very similar, differing by only 4 °C.  It is considerably more polar than benzene, with a dielectric constant of 5.42 compared to 2.28 for benzene at 298 K. Fluorobenzene is a relatively inert compound reflecting the strength of the C–F bond.

Although it is usually considered a non-coordinating solvent, a metal complex of PhF has been crystallized.

See also
Bromobenzene
Chlorobenzene
Iodobenzene

References

Fluoroarenes
Phenyl compounds